The 1998 Big East men's basketball tournament took place at Madison Square Garden in New York City. Its winner received the Big East Conference's automatic bid to the 1998 NCAA tournament. It is a single-elimination tournament with four rounds and the three highest seeds received byes in the first round. All 13 Big East teams were invited to participate. Connecticut finished with the best record in the regular season and was awarded the top seed.

Connecticut defeated Syracuse in the final, 69–64 to earn its third Big East tournament championship.

Bracket

Championship game Summary

Awards
Dave Gavitt Trophy (Most Outstanding Player): Khalid El-Amin, Connecticut

All-Tournament Team
 Ron Artest, St. John's
 Ryan Blackwell, Syracuse
 Todd Burgan, Syracuse
 Khalid El-Amin, Connecticut
 Richard Hamilton, Connecticut
 Rashamel Jones, Connecticut

References
  

Tournament
Big East men's basketball tournament
Basketball in New York City
College sports in New York City
Sports competitions in New York City
Sports in Manhattan
Big East men's basketball tournament
Big East men's basketball tournament
1990s in Manhattan
Madison Square Garden